Kushtia Polytechnic Institute (KPI) is a government technical institute in Kushtia, Bangladesh. It is the largest polytechnic institute in Bangladesh.

A study of job satisfaction among teachers at KPI and seven other government polytechnics found that overall it was low. Out of economic necessity, about a tenth of male teachers and a third of female teachers work a part-time job on the side. 

The institute is known for its variety of subjects offered at the diploma level under five areas of engineering. These are Civil Engineering, Computer Engineering, Electrical Engineering, Electronics Engineering, and Mechanical Engineering. Some students have had luck finding jobs right after their diploma, while others have graduated with renewed passion to further their education. Its also comes under one of the top 10 polytechnic institute in Bangladesh.

See also 
 Dhaka Polytechnic Institute
 Chittagong Polytechnic Institute
 Faridpur Polytechnic Institute

References 

Vocational education in Bangladesh
Kushtia District
Polytechnic institutes in Khulna Division
Organisations based in Kushtia District
Educational institutions established in 1964
1960s establishments in East Pakistan